The Akron Zips football team is a college football program representing the University of Akron in the Football Bowl Subdivision (FBS) of the National Collegiate Athletic Association (NCAA). Akron plays its home games on InfoCision Stadium on the campus of the University of Akron in Akron, Ohio. The Zips compete in the Mid-American Conference as a member of the East Division.

The team was established in 1891 when the school was known as Buchtel College and became the University of Akron in 1913. In 1926, the athletic teams were named the Zippers, after rubber boots manufactured by the B.F. Goodrich Company, which was headquartered in Akron at the time. The name was shortened to "Zips" in 1950. Akron was originally classified as a Small College school in the 1937 season until 1972. Akron received Division II classification in 1973, before becoming a Division I-AA program in 1980 and a Division I-A (now FBS) program in 1987. The Zips were the first team to move from Division I-AA to Division I-A.  In 2005, the Zips won the Mid-American Conference championship for the first time in the program's history. Through the 2015 season, the Zips have an overall record of 507–524–36.

History

Early history (1891–1972)

The University of Akron football team was established in 1891. In their first game, the team, then called Buchtel College, defeated Western Reserve Academy by a score of 22–6 in Hudson, Ohio. Buchtel went on to finish its first season with a 1–3 record. The following year, Buchtel hired Frank Cook as the school's first ever head coach. Cook led Buchtel to a 3–4 record during his only season has head coach. In 1893, the college hired John Heisman to become the football and baseball coach. Heisman lead Buchtel to their first winning season with a 5–2 record in 1893, and then led them to their first undefeated season, albeit a single game season in which they defeated the Ohio State Buckeyes. While at Buchtel, Heisman also helped invent the snap, which is still used in modern-day football. The early years for Buchtel saw many coaching changes, as the program went through nine different coaches in the 22-year span. Buchtel College changed its name to the University of Akron in 1913.

Coach Fred Sefton served as the head football coach of the Zippers for nine seasons, from 1915 to 1923, compiling a record of 33–34–4. Sefton's teams posted winning records in five of Sefton's nine seasons, including four of his final five. Sefton resigned as head coach after the 1923 season. James W. Coleman was hired as Akron's head football coach after Sefton's resignation. His final record in two seasons with the Zippers is 6–10. George Babcock took over as head coach after Coleman's departure and led the Zips to a 5–2–2 record before departing to accept the head football coach position at Cincinnati. Red Blair was hired as the team's next head coach after Babcock's departure. In nine seasons at the helm of the Zips, Blair's teams compiled a record of 43–30–5. Blair's 1929 Akron team compiled a record of 9–1. His 1930 team went 7–1 and his 1935 team posted a 6–3 record for the best three years of Blair's tenure. Blair resigned as head coach of the Zips after the 1935 season. Jim Aiken was hired as the Zippers' head coach after Blair's resignation. Aiken's three seasons were all winning, as his teams compiled yearly records of 6–2–1, 7–2 and 6–3 for a grand total of 19–7–1. Aiken departed the Zips after the 1938 season to accept the head football coach position at Nevada.

Thomas Dowler was hired to lead the Zippers football program after Aiken's departure. In two seasons as head coach, Dowler's teams compiled a record of 7–9–2. Otis Douglas took over the reins of the Akron football program after Dowler and his teams struggled. In two seasons, the Zippers posted a record of 5–10–3 that included a winless 0–7–2 mark in what turned out to be Douglas' final season. Akron did not field a football team from 1943 to 1945 due to the events surrounding World War II. Paul Baldacci was hired as Akron's head coach after the three season hiatus was over. Baldacci served as head coach for two seasons, compiling a record of 7–10 that included yearly records of 5–4 and 2–6. Akron's on-the-field struggles continued during the tenure of Baldacci's successor, William Houghton, whose tenure produced a 7–27–1 record with no winning seasons or more than two wins in a single season. Under head coach Kenneth Cochrane, the Zippers broke out of their slump, posting yearly records of 2–6–1 and 6–3 before Cochrane stepped down to focus on his duties as athletics director at Akron. Cochrane shorted the school's athletic nickname from "Zippers" to "Zips". Joe McMullen came to Akron from Washington & Jefferson and achieved moderate success as the Zips head coach. While his teams did compile an overall winning record during McMullen's seven-season tenure (30–28–3), declining records of 4–5 and 1–8 led to his firing after the 1960 season. In 1961, the Zips hired Gordon Larson, who had been an assistant coach under Woody Hayes at Ohio State. Larson helped the Zips finish 2nd in the Ohio Athletic Conference 3 times in his first five seasons, going 26–8 in conference play during those five season. In 1966, the Zips left the Ohio Athletic Conference, and became an Independent football program. During its Independence era, the Zips put together the best run in school history, winning 38 games from 1968 to 1971, also going to the 1968 Grantland Rice Bowl. In 12 seasons, Larson had a record of 74–33–5. At the time of his retirement from coach, Larson was the all-time wins leader among head coaches in Akron football history. Larson remained at the university as the athletics director.

Jim Dennison era (1973–1985)

In 1973, the Zips promoted long-time assistant, Jim Dennison to replace the retired Larson. His 1976 Akron squad played for the NCAA Division II championship (Pioneer Bowl), losing to the Montana State Bobcats, 24-13.  Under Dennison's tutelage, the Zips transitioned from NCAA Division II to Division I-AA and posted an 80–62–2 record that included a I-AA playoff berth in 1985 and nine winning seasons in Dennison's thirteen. Despite these successes, Dennison was fired as head coach after the 1985 season.

Gerry Faust era (1986–1994)

In 1985, Akron president William Muse replaced Dennison with former Notre Dame head coach Gerry Faust. Muse wanted the program to have "instant credibility" during its transition into a 1-A school in 1987. Adams and Muse felt that Faust was more prepared to lead the Zips as they transitioned into a 1-A institution. Faust struggled to get acclimated to the small budget school, struggling to a 25–23–2 start after his first 4 seasons with the Zips. Faust's Zips teams never won more than seven games in one season. Following a 1–10 finish in 1994, he was relieved of his coaching duties and became a fundraiser for the university. Faust's 43 wins placed him 3rd in Akron career wins leaders. The Zips became the first ever program to transition from I-AA to 1-A when they made the move in 1987. Akron joined the Mid-American Conference in 1992.

Lee Owens era (1995–2003)

Lee Owens, a former Ohio State assistant and highly successful Ohio high school head coach, was hired by the Zips as head football coach after Faust's firing. Owens had three winning seasons (most by any Akron coach during the major-college era), including a MAC East co-championship in 2000 (shared with Marshall), but his overall record was 40–61, which led to his firing by athletics director Mike Thomas after nine seasons. Jason Taylor (Pro Football Hall of Fame), Dwight Smith (consensus All-American, Super Bowl champion) and Charlie Frye (NFL QB) were among star players during Owens' tenure.

J. D. Brookhart era (2004–2009)

J. D. Brookhart, previously offensive coordinator at Pittsburgh, became the 25th head coach of Akron on December 15, 2003, the program's third head coach since gaining Division I-A status in 1987. In his second season, he led the Zips to their first Mid-American Conference championship and their first bowl game in school history, the 2005 Motor City Bowl, which they lost, 38–31, to the Memphis.  He was fired after the 2009 season, when the Zips went 3–9. Brookhart's final record at Akron is 30–42.

Rob Ianello era (2010–2011)

In December 2009, Akron hired Rob Ianello, previously wide receivers coach at Notre Dame, as the Zips head football coach. He lost his first eleven games as a head coach before getting the victory over Buffalo in the final game of the 2010 season. His only other win as Akron's head football coach was a 36–13 defeat of VMI (a Football Championship Subdivision team) in 2011. 
Ianello was fired as Akron's head coach after just two seasons and a dismal 2–22 record.

Terry Bowden era (2012–2018)

On December 22, 2011, it was announced North Alabama head coach Terry Bowden, son of legendary coach Bobby Bowden, would be hired as the 27th head football coach of the Akron Zips, and he was formally introduced on December 28, 2011. An Akron assistant coach in 1986 under head coach Gerry Faust, Terry Bowden had achieved notoriety in the 1990s with a successful six-year stint as the head football coach at Auburn, compiling a record of 47–17–1 that included a twenty-game winning streak. In his first year, Bowden duplicated Ianello's 1–11 record from 2011 in what was dubbed as a rebuilding year.

On September 14, 2013, Bowden led Akron against the University of Michigan in Ann Arbor and came within a few yards of defeating the Wolverines, losing 28–24 after an incomplete pass from the Wolverines' 3-yard line on the final play of the game went out of the back of the end zone. Akron lead at various points during the game: 10–7 in the third quarter after a 28-yard passing touchdown from Kyle Pohl to Zach D'Orazio; and 24–21 in the fourth quarter after a one-yard pass from Pohl to Tyrell Goodman. Bowden's 2013 team showed improvement, compiling a 5–7 record on the season that included snapping the nation's longest road losing streak (28) with a 24–17 victory at Miami (OH). Akron would finish 5–7 on the season. For the signs of improvement shown by the Zips, Akron extended Bowden's contract by two years through 2017. In 2014, Bowden led the Zips to another 5–7 mark with a 3–5 record in MAC play to finish in a tie for fourth place in the MAC East Division. The Zips began the season with a 41–0 shutout of Howard. Akron then lost to Penn State by a score of 21–3. The third game of the season saw the Akron Zips lose to Marshall by a score of 48–17. The Zips would then reel off three straight wins, upsetting   Pittsburgh, defeating Eastern Michigan and Miami (OH). Akron would then lose its next four, beginning with Ohio, then Bowling Green and Buffalo. Akron defeated UMass in its next-to-last game to set up an opportunity to attain bowl eligibility in its last regular season game, but the Zips lost to archrival Kent State by a score of 27–24.

In 2015, the Zips finished the season at 8–5 with a 5–3 record in MAC play to finish in a tie for second place in the MAC East Division. To kick off the season, Bowden led the Zips into Norman, Oklahoma for a showdown against one of the country's all-time college football powers, No. 10 Oklahoma. The Zips would lose by a score of 41–3. Akron would then lose to Pittsburgh the following week to start the season at 0–2. Akron would pick up its first win of the 2015 campaign the following week against Savannah State. Akron beat Louisiana-Lafayette in game four by a score of 35–14. The following week, the Zips lost to Ohio, before defeating Eastern Michigan by a score of 47–21. The Zips then lost to Bowling Green and Central Michigan before finishing the season on a five-game winning streak, defeating UMass, Miami (OH), Buffalo to attain bowl eligibility, Kent State in the regular season finale, and Utah State in the Famous Idaho Potato Bowl.

Bowden led the Zips to a 5–7, 3–5 record in MAC play to finish in a tie for third place in the MAC East Division in 2016. The season began with a victory over VMI. The next week, Akron went to Madison, Wisconsin for a showdown against No. 10 Wisconsin. The Zips lost the game by a score of 54–10. Next, the Zips defeated Marshall by a score of 65–38, the most points Marshall had allowed in a football game in 25 years. The next week, Akron lost to Appalachian State before defeating Kent State and Miami (OH). After getting blanked 41–0 by No. 24 Western Michigan, the Akron Zips beat Ball State by a score of 35–25. The Zips would then lose its last four games of the season, beginning with Buffalo, then Toledo, Bowling Green and Ohio. On December 2, 2018, Bowden was relieved of his duties as head coach after 7 seasons. His final record with the University of Akron was 35–52.

Tom Arth era (2019–2021)

On December 14, 2018, Akron hired Chattanooga head coach Tom Arth as the 28th head football coach of the program. The University of Akron dismissed coach Tom Arth on November 2, 2021, just short of him finishing his third season. His overall record while at Akron was a dismal 3-24.

Joe Moorhead era (2022–present)
On December 4, 2021, then-Oregon offensive coordinator and former Mississippi State head coach Joe Moorhead was announced as the 29th head coach of the Akron Zips. Moorhead signed a five-year contract with the university worth $2.5 million excluding incentives.

Conference affiliations
Akron has competed both as an independent and within multiple conferences.

 Independent (1891–1914)
 Ohio Athletic Conference (1915–1935)
 Independent (1936–1947)
 Ohio Athletic Conference (1948–1965)
 Independent (1966–1973)
 Division II (1974–1980)
 Mid-Continent Conference (1978–1979)
 Ohio Valley Conference (1980–1986)
 Division I-A Independent (1987–1991)
 Mid-American Conference (1992–present)

Conference championships

Conference championships
Akron has won one conference championship, winning the 2005 MAC East Division title followed by their 31–30 victory in the 2005 MAC Championship Game.

Division championships

† Co-champions

Bowl games

Akron has participated in three bowl games in its history, compiling a 1–2 record. Prior to 1987, the Zips were not a part of the Football Bowl Subdivision (formerly Division I–A). J. D. Brookhart arrived in 2004 and led the Zips to one bowl game in his six seasons as head coach, an automatic berth in the 2005 Motor City Bowl. The team has subsequently appeared in two bowl games under Terry Bowden.

Playoff appearances

NCAA Division I-AA
Akron has participated in the Division I-AA playoffs once in its history, compiling a 0–1 record.

NCAA Division II

Head coaches
The Akron Zips have had 28 head coaches throughout the program's history.  With 80 victories, Jim Dennison is first overall in the program's history, followed by Gordon K. Larson (74 wins) and Gerry Faust (43).

Notable former assistant coaches

The Zips football program has had several assistant coaches who went on to make notable achievements, from longevity in their tenure as collegiate coaches to becoming head coaches at the NCAA FBS level.
Paul Bixler - Assistant Coach (1936–39)
Terry Bowden - Assistant Coach (1986)
Jim Dennison - Assistant Coach (1965–72)
Otis Douglas - Line Coach (1939–40)
Luke Fickell - Defensive Line Coach (2000–01)
Hal Hunter - Offensive Line Coach (1987–90)
Jack Lengyel - Assistant Coach (1959)
Tom Reed - Defensive Line Coach (1969–72)
Jim Tressel - Graduate Assistant (1975–78)

Rivalries

Kent State
 
The two schools first met in 1923 and have played 56 times through the 2013 meeting. Akron went 11–0–1 in the first 12 meetings in the series between 1923 and 1941, with no games played from 1924–27 and 1937–39. Kent State started a 10-game winning streak in 1942 through 1954, though no games were played during the World War II years of 1943–45 when neither school fielded teams. After the 1954 meeting, the rivalry was scrapped due to a lack of competition. It was reinstated in 1972 and has been an annual contest since 1983. In 1992, Akron joined the MAC and the rivalry became a conference game.

Since 1946, the two teams have played for the Wagon Wheel trophy. The story goes that John R. Buchtel was searching for a site to start a new college in 1870 near what is now Kent State University when his wagon became stuck in the mud. The horses pulled the wagon apart and one of the wheels ended up being buried. Buchtel would eventually settle on a site in Akron for Buchtel College. In 1902, while digging for a pipeline in Kent, the wheel was discovered and eventually came into the possession of Kent State dean of men Dr. Raymond Manchester. It was he who suggested in 1945 that the wheel be used as a trophy for the winner of the Kent State-Akron football game.

Youngstown State

The Zips have played the Youngstown State 35 times in football. They played for the Steel Tire, named for the products that both cities were known for. In 1995, the series was discontinued with Youngstown State holding a 19–14–2 edge.

Facilities

Rubber Bowl (1940–2008)

The Akron Zips football team played their first game in the stadium on October 5, 1940 against Western Reserve (now known as Case Western Reserve University), before getting their first win in the facility November 9 of that year against rival Kent State. Prior to playing at the Rubber Bowl, the Zips football teams played at Buchtel Field, a 7,000-seat facility that opened in 1923. The Zips recorded their first sellout in the Rubber Bowl on September 30, 1961. In 1971, the university purchased the stadium for $1 from the city. An artificial surface was installed in 1983, which was replaced with AstroPlay in 2003. The Zips played 324 games at the stadium, which included their first-ever appearance on ESPN in 1986. Other notable games include the highest-scoring game in the stadium's history, a 65–62 victory over Eastern Michigan in 2001, as well as a 65–7 Akron victory over Howard University in 2003. In 2005, the Zips clinched their first Mid-American Conference East Division title and spot in the 2005 MAC Championship Game with a 35–3 win over arch-rival Kent State in that year's Wagon Wheel game. Akron would go on to win the 2005 MAC Championship with a last-second 31–30 win over Northern Illinois at Ford Field in Detroit.

In 2003, the university began exploring the feasibility of building an on-campus stadium to replace the Rubber Bowl, which was in disrepair and several miles away from campus. In 2007, plans were announced for a new stadium, later known as InfoCision Stadium – Summa Field, with work beginning in January 2008 and opening in September 2009. The final Akron Zips football game at the Rubber Bowl took place on November 13, 2008 against the Buffalo Bulls.  The game was nationally televised on ESPN and featured the two teams tied for first place in the Mid-American Conference's East Division with identical 5–4 (3–2) records entering the game.  Buffalo defeated the Zips 43–40 in four overtimes in front of a crowd of 18,516.  For the Zips, it was both the first four-overtime game and the first overtime loss in school history. After the game, a special ceremony with current and former players and coaches was held to honor the 68-year history of the stadium.

InfoCision Stadium–Summa Field (2009–present)

InfoCision Stadium was constructed as part of a building initiative undergone by the University of Akron called the "New Landscape for Learning." The $300 million construction program included the construction and renovations of numerous buildings on campus, including the Buchtel College of Arts and Sciences building, an honors complex, a student recreation center, and a student union. Due to the high maintenance costs for the facility, the decision was made to construct an on-campus stadium.

To build the new stadium, several dormitories had to be demolished and the properties of local tenants were acquired using eminent domain. In order to house the displaced students, the University spent $22.6 million to purchase Quaker Square, a former Quaker Oats Company oat silo that was converted into a hotel.

The home opener of the 2009 football season marked the first game held in InfoCision Stadium.  In it, the Zips defeated Morgan State 41–0. To mark the occasion, a ribbon-cutting ceremony was held to inaugurate the new stadium.  Amongst those who cut the ribbon were Don Plusquellic (Mayor of Akron), Betty Sutton (member of the United States House of Representatives), and Luis Proenza (President of the University of Akron).

Stile Athletics Field House
An indoor training facility used primarily for the football team. It includes a full practice football field, extensive weight room, indoor track and offices for the football program.

Logos and uniforms 
In 2002, the University instituted a new athletics logo featuring the kangaroo as well as a custom font for "Akron Zips." The logo replaced the former Akron logo which featured a flying "A". The football program adapted the alternate logo for their helmets which featured an "A" and a profile view of a kangaroo. The first year of the logo change, the football helmets had the alternate logo with a navy colored oval around it. The following year, the navy oval was dropped. Additional changes that also came with the re-branding included the uniforms altered to change the yellow to gold.

Individual accolades

All-Americans
A total of 51 Zips have been recognized as All-Americans by various media selectors.  Among those selections, one has achieved consensus All-American status.

† Consensus All-American

Conference award winners
During Akron's 20-season tenure with the Mid-American Conference, a total of 4 Zips have been recognized with superlative conference honors.

Hall of Fame inductees

College Football Hall of Fame
One Zip has been inducted into the College Football Hall of Fame.

Pro Football Hall of Fame
One Zip has been inducted into the Pro Football Hall of Fame.

University of Akron Varsity "A" Sports Hall of Fame
The following individuals have been inducted into the University of Akron Varsity "A" Sports Hall of Fame for their contributions to the Zips football program:

 Dave Adolph
 Jim Aiken
 Isavelt Amison
 David Arango
 Floyd Azar
 Art Bailey
 Robert Bauer
 Jack Beidleman
 Scotty Bierce
 Earl Boedicker
 Thomas Boggs
 Jim Braccio
 Dennis Brumfield
 Tony Butowicz
 Richard Case
 Michael Clark
 Kenneth Cochrane
 Steve Cockerham
 Charles Costigan
 Park Crisp
 Carl Daum
 Ken Delaney
 Tom DeMarco
 Jim Dennison
 George Deo
 Robert Dombroski
 Ollie Dreisbach
 Glenn Evans
 Mike Fernella
 Frank Fisher
 Ignatius Frolin
 Ben Flossie
 Harold Frye
 Andy Graham
 Wayne Grant
 Ray Greene
 Art Hailey
 Mike Hatch
 Robert Hatherill
 Dennis Heckman
 John Heisman
 Earl Hensal
 Al Hodakievic
 Dave Holian
 Russell Holmes
 Lee R. Jackson
 Hayes Jenkins
 Verlin Jenkins
 Lillburn Johnson
 Christopher Kelley
 Clarence Kelly
 Alan Kerkian
 Russ Klaus
 Edwin Kregenow
 Mike Krino
 John Lahoski
 Gordon K. Larson
 Frank Lomax
 Edward Lopeman
 Robert Lyons
 Andrew Maluke
 Joe Mazzaferro
 Dick Miller
 Tony Pallija
 Clarence Palmer
 Joseph Papp
 Charles Parnell
 Bradley Reese
 Frank Rockwell
 Virgil Rogers
 Marion Rossi
 Dan Ruff
 Willard Russell
 Mario Russo
 Eric Schoch
 Donald Schultz
 Roderick Scott
 Gene Scruggs
 Darrington Seals
 James Semester
 Wilson Sparkhawk
 Carl Spessard
 Bill Sturgeon
 Clarence Swigart
 Ed Toth
 John Travis
 Carl Tsaloff
 Ronald Ulrich
 Mark Van Horn
 John Verdon
 Frank Wahl
 Ralph Waldsmith
 Frank Wargo
 Paul Winters
 Frank Witwer
 Frank Zazula
 Joseph Zemla
 Guy Zimmerman
 Don Zwisler

Records

Team records
 Consecutive victories 
11 (1929–30 & 1969–70)
 Margin of Victory 
62 vs. Western Reserve Acad. (1893)
 Total Offensive Yards
In a Season: 5,643 (2003) 
In a Game: 692 vs. Howard (2003)
 Points Scored
In a Season: 435 (2003) 
In a Regular Season Game: 65 vs. Howard (2003) & vs. Eastern Michigan (2001)
In a Bowl Game: 31 vs. Memphis (Motor City Bowl, 2005)

Individual records

 Total Offense
Career: Charlie Frye – 11,478 yards
Season: Charlie Frye – 3,837 yards (2003)
Game: Charlie Frye vs. Central Michigan – 460 yards (2003)
 Total Touchdowns Scored
Career: Brandon Payne – 43
Season: Dennis Kennedy (2008) – 18
Game: Terry Cameron (1978) & Bobby Hendry (2001) – 5
 Total Touchdowns Responsible For
Career: Charlie Frye – 83
Season: Charlie Frye (2003) – 29
Game: Terry Cameron (1978), Bobby Hendry (2001) & Luke Getsy (2005) – 5

 Total Points Scored (Position Players)
Career: Brandon Payne – 260
Season: Dennis Kennedy – 110 (2008)
Game: Art Bailey (1958), Terry Cameron (1978) & Bobby Hendry (2001) – 30
 All-Purpose Yards
Career: Jack Beidleman – 5,377 yards
Season: Domenik Hixon – 2,139 yards (2005)
Game: Jack Beidleman vs. Youngstown State – 362 yards (1969)

Passing

 Passing Yards
Career: Charlie Frye – 11,049
Season: Charlie Frye – 3,549 (2003)
Game: Luke Getsy – 455 vs. Memphis (2005)
 Pass Completions
Career: Charlie Frye – 913
Season: Luke Getsy – 278 (2005)
Game: Charlie Frye – 36 vs. Kent State (2003)
 Pass Attempts
Career: Charlie Frye – 1,436
Season: Luke Getsy (2005) – 525
Game: Luke Getsy – 59 vs. Memphis (2005)

 Completion Percentage
Career: Charlie Frye – 63.6%
Season (minimum 150 attempts): Charlie Frye – 65.8% (2002)
Game (minimum 10 completions): Charlie Frye – 80.5% vs. Penn State (2004)
 Touchdown Passes
Career: Charlie Frye – 64
Season: Luke Getsy – 23 (2005)
Game: Luke Getsy vs. Northern Illinois – 5

Rushing

 Rushing Yards
Career: Mike Clark – 4,257
Season: Mike Clark – 1,786 (1986)
Game: James Black – 295 vs. Austin Peay (1983)
 Rushing Attempts
Career: Mike Clark – 804
Season: James Black – 351 (1983)
Game: James Black (1983) vs. Austin Peay – 52

 Rushing Touchdowns
Career: Brandon Payne – 39
Season: Dennis Kennedy (2008) – 17
Game: Terry Camerson (1978) & Bobby Hendry (2001) – 5
 100-Yard Rushing Games
Career: Mike Clark – 24
Season: Mike Clark (1986) – 9

Receiving

 Receiving Yards
Career: Jabari Arthur – 2,653
Season: Domenik Hixon – 1,210 (2005)
Game: Jabari Arthur – 223 vs. Western Michigan (2007)
 Receptions:
Career: Jabari Arthur – 184
Season: Jabari Arthur (2007) – 86 
Game: Jabari Arthur – 15 vs. Westen Michigan (2007)

 Touchdown Receptions 
Career: Dan Ruff – 27
Season: Dan Ruff – 11 (1968)
Game: Dan Ruff – 4 vs. Ball State (1969)
 Receiving Average Gain Per Reception
Career (minimum 75 receptions): Dan Ruff – 19.9
Season (minimum 30 receptions): Dan Ruff (1969) – 22.9
Game (minimum 75 receptions): Dan Ruff vs. Ball State – 39.0

Defensive

 Tackles
Career: Steve Cockerham – 715
Season: Brad Reese – 221 (1980)
Game: Brad Reese – 35 vs. Western Kentucky (1980)
 Tackles For Loss
Career: Jason Taylor – 41.0
Season: Bill Hadden – 19 (1985)

 Sacks
Career: Jason Taylor – 21.0
Season: Jason Taylor (1996) & Ken Williams (1993) – 10.0
 Interceptions
Career: Gary Tyler – 18
Season: Dick Miller (1937) – 13
Game: Dick Miller vs. Baldwin Wallace (1937) – 6

Kicking

Scoring
Career: Robert Stein – 268
Season: Igor Iveljic (2008) – 92
Game: Daron Alcorn (1992), Zac Derr (2001) & Jason Swiger (2003) – 17
Field Goals Made
Career: Bob Dombroski – 51
Season: Russ Klaus – 19 (1985)
Game: Andy Graham (1979), Russ Klaus (1985) & Daron Alcorn (1992)  – 5
Longest Made: Daron Alcorn – 56 yards vs. Toledo- Holder: Jamie Harsh (1992)

Field Goals Attempted
Career: Daron Alcorn – 76
Season: Russ Klaus – 29 (1985)
Game: Daron Alcorn vs. Temple (1992) – 6 – Holder: Jamie Harsh
Field Goal Percentage
Career (15 min. attempts): Bob Dombroski – .739
Season (1 min. attempt): Bob Dombroski – .917 (1989)
Game (4 min. attempts): Ryan Klaus – 1.000 vs. Bowling Green (1985)

Punting
 Punts
Career: Andy Grahm – 274
Season: Zach Campbell – 81 (2010)
Game: John Stec – 14 vs. Ohio State (2007)
 Total Punting Yardage
Career: Andry Graham – 10,693
Season: Zach Campbell – 3,061 (2010)
Game: Bill Rudison – 613 vs. Virginia Tech (1989)
 Average Punting Yardage
Career: Mike Hayes – 42.2
Season: Ray Dodge – 44.9 (1948)
Game: Daron Alcorn – 51.8 vs. Cincinnati (1992)

Kick Returns
 Kick Return Yards
Career: Matt Carter – 1,366
Season: Matt Carter – 867 (2002)
Game: Matt Carter – 180 vs. Marshall (2001)
 Kick Return Yard Average
Career: Jim Braccio – 26.2
Season: Bryan Williams – 31.9 (2007)
Game (2 min. attempts): David Harvey – 78.5 vs. North Texas (2006)
 Kick Returns for Touchdowns
Career: Frank Zazula, Jim Braccio & Dan Ruff – 2
Season: Dan Ruff – 2 (1967)

Punt Returns
 Punt Return Yards
Career: Pat Snow – 535
Season: Matt Cherry – 305 (2003)
Game: Jeff Sweitzer – 133 vs. Northern Arizona (1989)
 Punt Return Yard Average
Career: Matt Cherry – 13.3
Season: Domenik Hixon – 17.2 (2004)
Game (3 min. attempts): Domenik Hixon – 39.0 vs. Ball State (2004)
 Punt Returns for Touchdowns
Career: Jeff Sweitzer & Matt Cherry – 3
Season: Jeff Sweitzer (1989) & Matt Cherry (2003) – 2 
Game: Jeff Sweitzer – 2 vs. Northern Arizona (1989)

Zips in professional football

Akron has produced a total of 10 NFL draft selections.
The following "Active" and "All-Star" lists account for past and present University of Akron football players that have participated in the National Football League, the Canadian Football League, and the Arena Football League.

Active
As of December 2016, there are a total of 7 Zips listed on team rosters in the NFL, CFL, and AFL.

Nordly Capi – LB – Arizona Cardinals
Shawn Lemon – DL – Edmonton Elks
Justin March-Lillard – LB – Dallas Cowboys
Almondo Sewell – DT – Edmonton Elks

All-Stars
Among the numerous Zips that have participated in the NFL, CFL, and AFL, a total of 3 have received all-star recognition by their respective leagues.

Daron Alcorn – K
AFL All-Arena ( & )
Andre Jones – DB
AFL All-Arena
Jason Taylor – DE
NFL Pro Bowl (2000, 2002, 2004, 2005, 2006, 2007)
NFL All-Pro (2000, 2002, 2006)

NFL draft selections
Akron has had 17 players selected in the NFL Draft. Daron Alcorn became the final pick of the 1993 NFL Draft, a pick that has been dubbed as Mr. Irrelevant.

Key

Selections

Future non-conference opponents 
Announced schedules as of January 9, 2022.

References

External links

 

 
American football teams established in 1891
1891 establishments in Ohio